Robert Patterson, FRS (1802–1872) was an Irish businessman and naturalist born in Belfast, Ireland.

Biography

The eldest son of Robert Patterson (1750–1831), owner of a mill-furnishing business in Belfast established in 1786, Robert Patterson was born into a wealthy family. He was educated first at the Belfast Academy under the direction of a Dr. Bryce, and then at the Belfast Academical Institution.  Here he won a prize for an essay on the natural history of Lough Neagh.

When his father died in 1831, Patterson took over management of the family business, eventually marrying Mary Ferrar, one of whose ancestors had come to Ireland as a captain in Schomburg's Horse regiment. The newly-weds settled at No. 3 College Square North, Belfast, where most of his 11 children were born.

At 19 Robert Patterson was one of seven young men who, on 5 June 1821, gathered at the house of Dr. James Lawson Drummond, at No. 5, Chichester Street to form the Belfast Natural History Society, which established the first museum in Ireland to be built by public subscription, at No. 7 College Square North. He served the society, later renamed, for more than fifty years, occupying every office.  He was also a member of the Belfast Literary Society and the Royal Irish Academy. The Royal Society elected him a Fellow in 1859, and he was an early member of the British Association, serving as secretary to the Natural History section.
Established as a significant naturalist in his thirties, Patterson had close links with  Charles Darwin, Thomas Bell, Edward Forbes, William Yarrell and Charles Lucien Bonaparte. Patterson, FRS, MRIA died at his house in College Square North, Belfast, in February, 1872, after a fall. He is not to be confused with his second son, Robert Lloyd Patterson (1836-1906), or with his grandson Robert Patterson (1863-1931) who were also naturalists.

Books
Insects Mentioned in Shakespeare's Plays (1842)
 A Glossary of Words in Use in the Counties of Antrim and Down – a dialect study
Zoology for Schools (1846–48; later editions).
 Ed.Volume 4 of William Thompson's Natural History of Ireland (1856).

Patterson also prepared, for the Department of Science and Art, a series of large coloured diagrams, illustrated by Joseph Wolf. These were widely used in schools in Britain, Ireland and the United States.

References

Nash, R. and Ross, H.C.G. The development of natural history in early 19th century Ireland in From Linnaeus to Darwin: commentaries on the history of biology and geology Society for the bibliography of Natural History 13:27-
Foster, J. W. and Chesney, H. C. G (eds.), 1977. Nature in Ireland: A Scientific and Cultural History. Lilliput Press. .

Gallery

External links
BHL Introduction to zoology : for the use of schools / by Robert Patterson; with upwards of 330 illustrations and a glossary of scientific terms London Simms and M'Intyre,1848.
BHL Letters on the natural history of the insects mentioned in Shakespeare's plays : with incidental notices of the entomology of London W. S. Orr & Co.,1838.

1802 births
1872 deaths
Businesspeople from Belfast
Irish entomologists
Irish naturalists
Irish zoologists
Irish writers
People educated at the Belfast Royal Academy
Fellows of the Royal Society
19th-century Irish businesspeople